The Age of Octeen is the second studio album by American emo band Braid, released September 7, 1996 on Mud Records.

Released a year after their debut album, Frankie Welfare Boy Age 5, the album is notably 25 minutes shorter and features half as many songs. However,  The Age of Octeen made up for this by showcasing greatly improved production quality, and songs are on average three-to-four minutes long, almost twice as long as those featured on Frankie Welfare Boy Age 5.

Songs from the album were included in the Braid compilation album Movie Music, Vol. 2.

Reception 
Some have described The Age of Octeen as overshadowed when compared to other albums in the Braid discography. In retrospect, critics have described the album as under-appreciated. Ryan Reed writing for Pop Matters has called the album "an overlooked mini-masterpiece."

Track listing
 "My Baby Smokes" – 3:15
 "Nineteen Seventy Five" – 3:04
 "Divers" – 3:42
 "Jimmy Go Swimmer" – 2:26
 "Movie Clock Star" – 5:45
 "Eulalia, Eulalia" – 3:56
 "Grace Car Part One" – 4:10
 "Harrison Ford" – 4:00
 "American Typewriter" – 3:19 
 "The Chandelier Swing" – 3:24 
 "Autobiography" – 1:06

References

1996 albums
Braid (band) albums